The fire-fronted bishop (Euplectes diadematus) is a species of bird in the family Ploceidae.
It is found in Kenya, Somalia, and Tanzania.

References

fire-fronted bishop
Birds of East Africa
Birds of the Horn of Africa
fire-fronted bishop
Taxonomy articles created by Polbot